Mel Ferber (October 2, 1922 – June 19, 2003) was a television director and producer, who oversaw the live two-hour TV presentation of Wonderful Town and the pilot for 60 Minutes and other shows. Ferber was an executive producer of Good Morning America. He was a member of the Directors Guild of America.

Biography
Ferber was born and raised in New York City, and was a graduate of City College of New York. He became a World War II hero when, after landing at Utah Beach, he and four other members of his unit captured 464 German soldiers and used their weapons to rearm a French battalion (earning him the Croix de Guerre with Silver Star). He entered the TV industry after he was discharged.

As a member of CBS, Ferber directed Wonderful Town, the first live two-hour show on TV, in 1958. Subsequently, he earned Emmy nominations for his work as executive producer and creator of Good Morning America and executive producer of CBS' Calendar. He produced the pilot of 60 Minutes and directed the pilot of Happy Days. The 1972 Democratic National Convention's TV and radio work was produced by Ferber as well.

Ferber also directed and/or produced many television shows, including Studio One, That Was the Week That Was, Walter Cronkite's 21st Century, National Geographic, The Odd Couple, McMillan & Wife, Alias Smith and Jones, The Mary Tyler Moore Show, Busting Loose, Archie Bunker's Place, Quincy, M.E., Alice, Diff'rent Strokes and many more.

Ferber died on June 19, 2003, in Los Angeles from heart failure.

References

External links

1922 births
2003 deaths
Jewish American military personnel
American television directors
City College of New York alumni
Television producers from New York City
Recipients of the Croix de Guerre 1939–1945 (France)
Recipients of the Silver Star
American military personnel of World War II
20th-century American Jews
21st-century American Jews